Green Park Stadium is an international standards cricket stadium of Kanpur, India. Its seating capacity is 32,000 seats. It is the home ground of Uttar Pradesh cricket team.

This arena is an International Test match venue. Green Park is under the control of the Sports Department Uttar Pradesh. It has hosted international cricket matches in both of Test and ODI format. The stadium hosted the 500th test played by the Indian team. It also organized four Vivo IPL matches, on 19 and 21 May 2016 and on 10 and 13 May 2017.

As of 19 August 2017 it has hosted 22 Tests, 14 ODIs and 1 T20I. It is situated near the river Ganga.

The stadium was named after a British woman named Green who used to go horse riding there, and is nicknamed 'Billiards Table', and also 'Woolmer's turf', after the late cricket coach and player Bob Woolmer who was born in McRobert Hospital opposite to the stadium.

History
The Green Park Stadium is named after a woman named Green who used to practice horse riding here in the 1940s. It is located in the Civil Lines area in the north east part of Kanpur city near the banks of the river Ganga, which flows just behind the stadium.

It is the only stadium in India where a student gallery is available. Green Park has the largest manually operated scoreboard in the world. It also has video screens that are used during international matches.

India's first Test win over Australia in December 1959 was at the Green Park ground. This was also the first match to be played on a turf wicket here.

Since 1957 India has lost only twice at Kanpur, both times to the West Indies, in 1958 and again in 1983.

Infrastructure

The ends are known as the Mill Pavilion End and the Hostel End. These are named after the Elgin Mill and DAV College which are close to the stadium.

Lakshmi (Gulee) is the head of Women Cricket Division.

Records
 The ground hosted one 1987 Cricket World Cup Group B match, West Indies vs Sri Lanka.
 It hosted one Nehru Cup 1989 match, England vs India.
 It hosted the opening match of 1993 Hero Cup, Sri Lanka vs India.
 It hosted one Wills world series 1994–95 match, West Indies vs India.
 India registered their 100th Test victory here by defeating Sri Lanka by an innings and 144 runs
 It hosted India's 500th test match in September 2016, in which India beat New Zealand by 197 runs.
 Sourav Ganguly got 5 wickets vs Zimbabwe in 2000.
 It also hosted England in January 2002 which India won easily. Also turned out to be the only match of Anil Kumble as captain.
 It hosted its first day/night ODI on 29 October 2017 between India and New Zealand and India won this match by six runs.
 The highest team total in ODI in this stadium is 337/7 by India on 29 October 2017 vs New Zealand.
 Rohit Sharma is only the batsman who scored two centuries in ODI in this ground.
 Shreyas Iyer scored a century in the first innings and a half-century in the second innings in his debut test match against New Zealand in November 2021.

Gallery

See also

 BRSABV Ekana Cricket Stadium
 List of international cricket centuries at the Green Park Stadium
 List of Test cricket grounds

References 

Sports venues in Uttar Pradesh
Multi-purpose stadiums in India
Test cricket grounds in India
Buildings and structures in Kanpur
1987 Cricket World Cup stadiums
1996 Cricket World Cup stadiums
Sport in Kanpur
1945 establishments in India
Sports venues completed in 1945
20th-century architecture in India